Percy Dive (10 July 1881 – 17 September 1965) was an Australian cricketer. He played one first-class match for New South Wales in 1924/25.

See also
 List of New South Wales representative cricketers

References

External links
 

1881 births
1965 deaths
Australian cricketers
New South Wales cricketers
Cricketers from Sydney